In Berlin is a live album and the debut release of English post-punk band Blurt. It was recorded live at the Rock Against Junk concert in Berlin, Germany on 13 December 1980, and released the following year, through record label Armageddon. It reached No. 14 on the UK Indie Chart and No. 12 on the US chart.

The album was rereleased as a limited 500-copy edition of 10" plus 7", under the title Live in Berlin, on Factory Benelux (FBN-5) in February 2013.

Track listing

Personnel 
 Blurt

 Pete Creese – guitar, trombone
 Jake Milton – vocals, drums
 Ted Milton – vocals, saxophone

References

External links 

 

1981 debut albums
1981 live albums
No wave albums
Factory Records live albums
Ruby Records live albums